In Greek mythology, Carya was a Laconian princess as the daughter of the King Dion.

Family 
Carya's mother was Amphithea, daughter of Pronax of Argos. Her sisters were Lyco and Orphe.

Mythology 
Apollo, in reward for Dion and Amphithea receiving him with great reverence and hospitality, bestowed a gift of prophecy upon their daughters, but imposed a restriction that they should not betray gods nor search after forbidden lore.

Later, Dionysus also paid a visit to Dion's house and was received with equal hospitality; during his stay, he fell in love with Carya and lay with her secretly. He then left but, missing Carya, soon returned under pretext of consecrating a temple which Dion had built for him. But Lyco and Orphe, suspecting a love affair between Dionysus and their sister, guarded Carya to prevent her from having intercourse with the god. By doing so they committed a violation of the restrictions imposed by Apollo, so Dionysus, after several warnings and threats, drove the two sisters mad, in which state they ran off to Mount Taygetus, where they were transformed into rocks. Carya was changed by Dionysus into a walnut tree (Greek karya). From these circumstances later arose the local cult of Artemis Caryatis.

See also
List of Greek mythological figures

Notes

References 
Dictionary of Greek and Roman Biography and Mythology. Ed. by William Smith (1870), v. 1, page 1027
Ausführliches Lexikon der griechischen und römischen Mythologie. Hrsg. von H.W. Roscher. Leipzig, Teubner, 1890-1897. Repr.: Hildesheim, Olms, 1965. Band I. A-H., S. 1028

Metamorphoses into trees in Greek mythology
Deeds of Apollo
Laconian mythology
Consorts of Dionysus
Classical oracles
Mythological Greek seers
Princesses in Greek mythology